The Eritrean blind snake (Letheobia erythraea) is a species of snake in the Typhlopidae family. It is endemic to Eritrea.

References

Further reading
 Scortecci, G. 1928 (1929). Rettili dell'Eritrea esistenti nelle Collezioni del Museo Civico di Milano. Atti della Società Italiana di Scienze Naturali, e del Museo Civico di Storia Naturale, Milano 67(3-4):290-339.

Letheobia
Snakes of Africa
Endemic fauna of Eritrea
Vertebrates of Eritrea
Reptiles described in 1929